Steve Zirnkilton (born Stephen Morgan Zirnkilton; August 18, 1958) is an American voice actor and former politician from Maine. Zirnkilton is best known for providing the opening narration of all U.S. series in the Law & Order franchise.

Early life and education
Zirnkilton grew up in York, Pennsylvania and spent summers in Maine. He graduated from New England College and began working for radio station WDEA in Ellsworth, Maine upon graduation. He later settled in Seal Harbor, Maine. Zirnkilton received a Legislative Sentiment for his work from Maine State Representative Chris Greeley.

Career

Politics
Zirnkilton, a Republican, served for eight years (four terms) in the Maine House of Representatives from 1982 to 1988 and again from 1992 to 1994. He represented part of Hancock County, Maine, including his residence in the village of Seal Harbor in the town Mount Desert. During his final term in the House of Representatives, Zirnkilton served in leadership as Assistant Minority Leader. In 1994, when then-Congresswoman Olympia Snowe decided not to seek re-election to the U.S. House of Representatives for Maine's 2nd congressional district, Zirnkilton sought to replace her. Zirnkilton lost the primary to fellow State Representative Richard A. Bennett, who eventually lost the general election to State Senator John Baldacci.

Zirnkilton also provides voiceovers for political ads, notably during Susan Collins's re-election campaign in 2014.

Acting
Zirnkilton is known for providing the opening narration of all US shows in the Law & Order franchise. He was hired by series creator Dick Wolf. Zirnkilton has also provided voices for Family Guy and The Rugrats Movie. He was a narrator for Faith Rewarded: The Historic Season of the 2004 Boston Red Sox. Zirnkilton narrated Ruby Ridge: Anatomy of a Tragedy on Investigation Discovery. He also provided the voice-over for a Sky One advertisement for the channel's Law & Order airings. Zirnkilton was the narrator for TLC's Code Blue: New Orleans and the syndicated series Arrest & Trial. He has been the announcer for the Kennedy Center Honors, and for the past seventeen years he has been the onstage announcer for the Top Cops Awards in Washington, D.C.

Filmography

Film

Television

References

External links

 
 

Living people
American male voice actors
Male actors from Maine
New England College alumni
Politicians from York, Pennsylvania
People from Mount Desert Island
Republican Party members of the Maine House of Representatives
1958 births
Candidates in the 1994 United States elections